America's Great Depression is a 1963 treatise on the 1930s Great Depression and its root causes, written by Austrian School economist and author Murray Rothbard. The fifth edition was released in 2000.

Brief summary
Rothbard holds the interventionist policies of the Herbert Hoover administration responsible for magnifying the duration, breadth, and intensity of the Great Depression. Rothbard explains the Austrian theory of the business cycle, which holds that government manipulation of the money supply sets the stage for the familiar "boom-bust" phases of the modern market. He then details the inflationary policies of the Federal Reserve from 1921 to 1929 as evidence that the depression was essentially caused not by speculation, but by government and central bank interference in the market.

Publishing history
 5th Edition: Auburn, Ala.: Ludwig von Mises Institute, June 15, 2000. Hardcover. 368 pages. . (With an introduction by Paul Johnson)
 4th Edition: New York: Richardson & Snyder/E.P. Dutton. 1983. Hardcover. 361 pages. .
 3rd Edition: New York: New York University Press. Co-sponsored by Institute for Humane Studies. 1975. Paperback. 361 pages. . Hardcover .
 2nd Edition: Menlo Park, California: Institute for Humane Studies, 1972. 361 pages. .
 1st Edition: Princeton, N.J.: D. Van Nostrand, 1963. Hardcover. 361 pages.

References

External links
 America's Great Depression at Mises Wiki
 America's Great Depression: Complete Text in HTML format (also in PDF format)

1963 non-fiction books
Books by Murray Rothbard
Non-fiction books about the Great Depression